Albania sent a team to compete at the 2008 Summer Olympics in Beijing, China which was organised by the National Olympic Committee of Albania.

Albania competed with eleven athletes in which of them being seven men and four females, competing in several sports such as athletics, and for the first time in judo. Other sports are swimming, weightlifting, wrestling, and shooting.

Although Albania didn't win any medals, it was an improvement on their performance at the 2004 Summer Olympics in Athens.

Weightlifter Romela Begaj came the closest to the medal rankings as she finished 5th in the Women's 58 kg category, lifting 216 kg in total.

The Albanians showed also good performances outside weightlifting. Sahit Prizreni, the world wrestling bronze medalist from 2007 in Baku competing for the second time for Albania in the Summer Olympics, He advanced to the round of 16 in Men's freestyle 60 kg, where he lost to Bazar Bazarguruev from Kyrgyzstan.

Elis Guri made his debut at the Summer Olympics in wrestling in the Men's Greco-Roman 96 kg category. In the round of 16 he defeated the Olympic champion of 2004, Karam Gaber, after three matches. In the quarterfinals he faced Mirko Englich of Germany. Despite a first-match win, Guri lost the other two matches and didn't qualify to the semifinals. He finished in 7th place, the best result for Albania so far at this sport.

Athletics

Key
 Note – Ranks given for track events are within the athlete's heat only
 Q = Qualified for the next round
 q = Qualified for the next round as a fastest loser or, in field events, by position without achieving the qualifying target
 NR = National record
 N/A = Round not applicable for the event
 Bye = Athlete not required to compete in round

Men

Women

Judo

Men

Shooting

Women

Swimming

Men

Women

Weightlifting

Wrestling

Key
  - Victory by Fall.
  - Decision by Points - the loser with technical points.
  - Decision by Points - the loser without technical points.

Men's freestyle

Men's Greco-Roman

References

Nations at the 2008 Summer Olympics
2008
Olympics